This Is My Ship is the debut album by Dartz!, released in 2007. Like most of their other releases, the cover artwork is by Dave House.

Critical reception
NME called the album "nerdy, snappy and smart; this is jerk-punk played by real live jerks."

Track listing
 "Network! Network! Network!"
 "A Simple Hypothetical"
 "Once, twice, again!"
 "Cold Holidays"
 "Prego Triangolos"
 "Laser Eyes"
 "St. Petersburg"
 "Harbour"
 "Documents"
 "Fantastic Apparatus"
 "Teaching Me To Dance"
 "The Lives Of Authors"
 "Ulysses" (hidden track)

References

External links
DARTZ! website

2007 albums
Dartz! albums